Sneaky Pete's is a Birmingham, Alabama-based chain of hot-dog restaurants founded by Pete Graphos in 1966 and sold to the present-owner Frank D'Amico in 1986. Sneaky Pete's corporate offices are located in Vestavia Hills, Alabama. As part of its franchise plan, many Sneaky Pete's stores are located inside gas station convenience stores under the nameplate Sneaky Pete's Express or Sneaky Pete's On-The-Go.. The company has also experimented with a more upscale sit-down style restaurant with a larger menu, dubbed Sneaky Pete's Cafe. Several locations are in the Greater Birmingham area, and other stores are located throughout Alabama.

External links

Hot dog restaurants in the United States
Restaurants in Birmingham, Alabama
Companies based in Birmingham, Alabama
Regional restaurant chains in the United States
Restaurants established in 1966
1966 establishments in Alabama
Hot dog restaurants